Events from the year 1939 in Scotland.

Incumbents 

 Secretary of State for Scotland and Keeper of the Great Seal –  John Colville

Law officers 
 Lord Advocate – Thomas Mackay Cooper
 Solicitor General for Scotland – James Reid

Judiciary 
 Lord President of the Court of Session and Lord Justice General – Lord Normand
 Lord Justice Clerk – Lord Aitchison
 Chairman of the Scottish Land Court – Lord Murray

Events 
 2 January – all-time highest attendance for a U.K. Association football league game as 118,730 people watch Rangers beat Celtic in an "Old Firm derby" played at Ibrox Park in Glasgow.
 1 May – RAF Lossiemouth formally opens.
 3 September – World War II:
 Declaration of war by the United Kingdom on Nazi Germany.
Of the 1,418 aboard, 98 passengers and 19 crew are killed; the first survivors are brought in to Greenock. On 7 September, survivors are visited by John F. Kennedy.
 4 September
 Civil servants of the Scottish Office begin to occupy its first office in Scotland, St Andrew's House on Calton Hill in Edinburgh.
 Several Citizens Advice Bureaux are founded in the United Kingdom to provide wartime information to the public, including Citizens Advice Edinburgh in Scotland.
 30 September – Jackie Paterson wins the British flyweight boxing title in an open-air bout in Glasgow.
 14 October – World War II: HMS Royal Oak sunk by a German U-boat in Scapa Flow, Orkney Islands with the loss of 833 crew.
 16 October – World War II: first enemy aircraft shot down by RAF Fighter Command, a Junkers Ju 88 brought down into the sea by Spitfires following an attack on Rosyth Naval Dockyard.
 17 October – World War II: first bomb lands in the U.K., at Hoy in the Orkney Islands.
 28 October
 A dust explosion in the colliery at Valleyfield, Fife, kills 35.
 World War II: First enemy aircraft forced down on British soil by RAF Fighter Command, a Heinkel He 111 brought down near Humbie by a Spitfire flown by Archie McKellar following reconnaissance of the Firth of Clyde.
 30 October – World War II: British battleship  is unsuccessfully attacked by  under the command of captain Wilhelm Zahn off Orkney and is hit by three torpedoes, none of which explode; Winston Churchill (First Lord of the Admiralty), Admiral of the Fleet Dudley Pound (First Sea Lord) and Admiral Charles Forbes (Commander-in-Chief Home Fleet) are on board.
 1 December – World War II:  torpedoes Finnish vessel Mercator off Peterhead and the Norwegian Arcturus in the Firth of Forth.
 2 December – World War II: Swedish cargo ship Rudolf hits a mine and sinks off St Abb's Head.
 4 December – World War II: battleship  is badly damaged by a mine (laid by ) at the entrance to Loch Ewe.
 17 December – Danish cargo ship Bogo sinks off Fife Ness.
 21 December – boom defence vessel Bayonet explodes at Leith.
  is established as a Royal Navy shore establishment for Western Approaches Command at St Enoch's Hotel, Glasgow.
 Strathcarron Reservoir on the River Carron is completed.

Births 
 16 April – Donald MacCormick, broadcast journalist (died 2009)
 2 May – Mairi Hedderwick, illustrator
 4 June – George Reid, politician, Presiding Officer of the Scottish Parliament 2003-2007 
 8 June – Gordon Reid, actor (died 2003 in London)
 9 June - Eric Fernie, historian
 11 June – Jackie Stewart, racing driver
 July – Wes Magee, poet and children's author
 23 July – Donald Macgregor, marathon runner (died 2020)
 29 September – Jim Baxter, international footballer (died 2001)
 19 October – David Clark, Labour politician
 31 October – Trish Godman, Labour politician (died 2019)
 18 November – Ian McCulloch, actor
 Don Cameron, balloonist
 Dugald Cameron, industrial designer
 Duncan Macmillan, art historian
 The Mulgray Twins, Helen and Morna Mulgray, crime novelists

Deaths 
 18 April – Ishbel Hamilton-Gordon, Marchioness of Aberdeen and Temair, patron and promoter of women's interests (born 1857 in London)
 20 April – William Mitchell Ramsay, archaeologist and New Testament scholar (born 1851)
 13 September – Henry Halcro Johnston, botanist, physician, rugby union international and Deputy Lieutenant for Orkney (born 1856)
 21 September – George Washington Browne, architect (born 1853)
 Robert Bryden, artist and sculptor (born 1865)

The arts
 18 May – Cosmo Cinema opens in Glasgow as an art film theatre.
 Erik Chisholm's sonata An Riobhan Dearg is composed.
 Ian Niall's novel Wigtown Ploughman: Part of His Life is published under the author's real name, John McNeillie.

See also 
 Timeline of Scottish history
 1939 in Northern Ireland

References 

 
Years of the 20th century in Scotland
Scotland
1930s in Scotland